Where Men Are Men is a 1921 American silent Western film directed by William Duncan and starring Duncan, Edith Johnson and George Stanley.

Cast
 William Duncan as Vic Foster
 Edith Johnson as Eileen aka 'Princess'
 George Stanley as Frank Valone
 Tom Wilson as 'Dutch' Monahan
 Gertrude Wilson as Laura Valone
 Harry Lonsdale as R.C. Cavendish
 George Kunkel as Sheriff Grimes
 William McCall as Mike Regan
 Charles Dudley as Monty Green

References

Bibliography
 Rainey, Buck. Sweethearts of the Sage: Biographies and Filmographies of 258 actresses appearing in Western movies. McFarland & Company, 1992.

External links
 

1921 films
1921 Western (genre) films
American black-and-white films
Films directed by William Duncan
Silent American Western (genre) films
Vitagraph Studios films
1920s English-language films
1920s American films